The Trans-Catalina Trail is a long-distance trail which traverses Santa Catalina Island off the coast of southern California. Camping is allowed by permit from the Catalina Island Conservancy. There are five campgrounds along or near the trail: Hermit Gulch, Black Jack, Little Harbor, Two Harbors, and Parsons Landing. Hikers usually take between 2 and 5 days to complete the route.

Gallery

See also
 Long-distance trails in the United States

References

External links 
 Catalina Island Conservancy

Hiking trails in California
Long-distance trails in the United States